Songzhu is a railway station and metro station located in Beitun District, Taichung, Taiwan. It is served by the Taiwan Railways Administration Taichung line and the Green Line operated by Taichung Metro, connected by an out-of-station transfer.

Around the station
 Jiushe Park
 Nanxing Park
 Songzhu Plaza
 Save & Safe Beitun Store

See also
 List of railway stations in Taiwan

References

2018 establishments in Taiwan
Railway stations in Taichung
Railway stations opened in 2018
Railway stations served by Taiwan Railways Administration